Hossain Ali (born 10 September 1998) is a Bangladeshi cricketer. He made his first-class debut for Chittagong Division in the 2016–17 National Cricket League on 25 September 2016. He made his List A debut for Gazi Group Cricketers in the 2016–17 Dhaka Premier Division Cricket League on 29 April 2017. He made his Twenty20 debut for Rajshahi Kings on 7 November 2017 in the 2017–18 Bangladesh Premier League.

References

External links
 

1998 births
Living people
Bangladeshi cricketers
Chittagong Division cricketers
Gazi Group cricketers
Rajshahi Royals cricketers
People from Narsingdi District